KVLP-LP (101.5 FM) is a radio station broadcasting an adult album alternative format. Licensed to Visalia, California, United States, it serves the Visalia-Tulare area.  The station is currently owned by the Universal Life Church.

See also
List of radio stations in California

External links
 

VLP-LP
VLP-LP
Radio stations established in 2005
2005 establishments in California
Adult album alternative radio stations in the United States